Patrik Hrdina (born 15 May 1967) is a Czech windsurfer. He competed at the 1992 Summer Olympics and the 1996 Summer Olympics.

References

External links
 

1967 births
Living people
Czech male sailors (sport)
Czech windsurfers
Olympic sailors of Czechoslovakia
Olympic sailors of the Czech Republic
Sailors at the 1992 Summer Olympics – Lechner A-390
Sailors at the 1996 Summer Olympics – Mistral One Design
Sportspeople from Prague